Oliver T. Crinnigan (born 1947) is an Irish former Gaelic footballer who played for the Carbury club and at inter-county level with the Kildare senior football team.

Playing career

Crinnigan first played Gaelic football at juvenile and underage levels with the Carbury club before eventually joining the club's senior team while still a minor. He won a total of seven Kildare SFC titles between 1965 and 1985. Crinnigan also won a New York SFC title with the Sligo team.

Crinnigan first appeared on the inter-county scene with Kildare during a two-year tenure with the minor team. As a member of the under-21 team for four years, he won three successive Leinster U21FC titles and was in goal when Kildare beat Cork in the 1965 All-Ireland under-21 final. Crinnigan was still eligible for the minor grade when he joined the senior team in 1965 and never missed a championship game until his retirement in 1980. During that time, he lined out in six Leinster finals without success, however, he became Kildare's first ever All-Star recipient in 1978. Crinnigan also won a Railway Cup medal with Leinster.

Coaching career

Crinningan was in the twilight of his club career with Carbury when he became player-manager. He was denied an eighth Kildare SFC medal when Carbury were beaten by Johnstownbridge in 1988 final.

Honours

Carbury
Kildare Senior Football Championship: 1965, 1966, 1969, 1971 (c), 1972, 1974, 1985

Kildare
All-Ireland Under-21 Football Championship: 1965
Leinster Under-21 Football Championship: 1965, 1966, 1967

Leinster
Railway Cup: 1974

References

1947 births
Living people
Carbury Gaelic footballers
Kildare inter-county Gaelic footballers
Leinster inter-provincial Gaelic footballers
Gaelic football goalkeepers
Gaelic football managers
Gaelic football player-managers
Gaelic football selectors